Unknown is a 2006 American mystery thriller film directed by Simon Brand and written by Matthew Waynee. It stars Jim Caviezel, Greg Kinnear, Joe Pantoliano, Barry Pepper and Jeremy Sisto as a group of men kidnapped and locked in a factory with no memory of how they arrived there. Piecing together information around them, they realize that some were kidnapped and some were the kidnappers. They decide they must work together to figure out how to get away before the gang that captured them returns.

The film was previewed before a theater audience for the first time in New York City on December 13, 2005.

Plot
In a warehouse, a handful of men regain consciousness; they have no idea who they are or what happened to them. One is bound to a chair, another has been handcuffed and shot, a third has a broken nose, and the other two, one wearing a jean jacket and one wearing a rancher shirt, are also wounded. The man in the jean jacket wakes up first. He makes sure everyone is alive, then discovers that the windows are barred and the only door has a mechanized lock. He finds a ringing phone and picks it up. The caller asks what is going on and the jean jacket man tells the caller that everyone is fine. The caller tells him he will return in a few hours. Somewhere else, a money drop off is occurring. William Coles Jr. has been kidnapped.

In the warehouse, the bound asks to be untied. As the jean jacket man prepares to untie him, the man with the rancher shirt convinces him not to, telling him that the bound is not on the same side, or he would not have been tied up. As the jean jacket and rancher shirt men look for the keys to release the handcuffed man and treat his wound, the man with the broken nose wakes up and fights with them. At the drop off, the signal in the money bag goes silent; the cops enter to find the money gone.

In the warehouse, the men find a newspaper featuring a story about the kidnapping of a wealthy businessman named Coles. The men suspect that they were involved with the kidnapping, but do not know what their involvement was. They begin to experience flashbacks.

A gun is recovered, and the jean jacket man wins possession of it. Various attempts to free themselves, including trying to attract attention through a hole in the wall, and shooting out a window, fail. The men decide to work together to fight off the criminals who are coming, so all of them can go their separate ways.

The handcuffed man recalls a harrowing incident from his childhood when he was comforted by his friend. He claims the jean jacket man is his friend, but the jean jacket man cannot verify this. The handcuffed man dies from his wounds.

The police piece together who they believe the kidnappers are. They show photos of the suspects to Coles' wife Eliza. The handcuffed man, the bound man, and the jean jacket man are among the photos.

At the warehouse, the gang returns from the money pickup. The bound man remembers he is part of the gang and tries warning them of the trap. In the confusion, he is shot along with one of the gang members. After the rancher shirt man is pushed out at gunpoint, the others surrender. The jean jacket man recalls that he is part of the gang, but cannot accept that he is a criminal. He is greeted by the snakeskin boots-wearing gang leader and chastised for letting things go so wrong in the warehouse. A fight broke out between kidnappers and victims. Chemicals spilled during the fight rendered everyone unconscious and induced temporary amnesia. The jean jacket man is tasked with killing the rancher shirt man and the broken nosed man, and tells them he has to kill them or be killed himself.

After hearing gunshots near the grave that the bound man dug before losing his memory, the snakeskin boots leader asks the jean jacket man if he is looking at a cop. This sparks a memory that the jean jacket man was a cop working undercover in the gang. As the snakeskin boots leader looks over to see an empty grave, the broken nosed man comes out of the shadows to attack the gang members. The broken nosed man is killed, as are the remaining gang members. The rancher shirt man saves the jean jacket man's life by shooting the snakeskin boots leader, who has a gun leveled at the jean jacket man. The police arrive on the scene. The jean jacket man is praised for having survived so long undercover.

The rancher shirt man turns out to be Coles, the wealthy businessman, and as both are being treated, Eliza arrives and hugs her husband. The jean jacket man looks over at the couple, and upon seeing the wife, remembers that they were having an affair. The jean jacket man arranged the kidnapping and planned to get rich and win Eliza. Horrified by what he has done, he takes the ransom money to the officers. Coles introduces his wife to the jean jacket man.

Cast
 Jim Caviezel as Jean Jacket / Mitch Wozniak
 Barry Pepper as Rancher Shirt / William Coles Jr.
 Greg Kinnear as Broken Nose / Richard McCain
 Joe Pantoliano as Bound Man / Brockman
 Jeremy Sisto as Handcuffed Man / Bobby Kinkade
 Bridget Moynahan as Eliza Coles
 Peter Stormare as Snakeskin Boots / Stefan Burian
 Chris Mulkey as Detective James Curtis
 Clayne Crawford as Detective Anderson
 Kevin Chapman as Detective McGahey
 Mark Boone Junior as Bearded Man / Juarez
 Wilmer Calderon as Detective Molina
 David Selby as Police Captain Parker
 Adam Rodriguez as County Doctor
 Jeff Daniel Phillips as Iron Cross / Ray
 Victoria Justice as Daughter / Erin

Production
Portions of the film were shot in the Coachella Valley, California.

Critical reception
On the review aggregator Rotten Tomatoes, 38% of critics gave the film positive reviews, based on 48 reviews. On Metacritic, the film had an average score of 44 out of 100, based on 17 reviews.

References

External links
 
 
 
 
 

2006 films
2006 crime thriller films
2006 independent films
2000s mystery thriller films
2006 psychological thriller films
American crime thriller films
American independent films
American mystery thriller films
American nonlinear narrative films
American psychological thriller films
Films about amnesia
2000s English-language films
2000s American films